Jack Fitzpatrick (18 December 1911 – 23 January 1999) was an Australian cricketer. He played five first-class matches for New South Wales between 1937/38 and 1938/39.

See also
 List of New South Wales representative cricketers

References

External links
 

1911 births
1999 deaths
Australian cricketers
New South Wales cricketers
Cricketers from Sydney